The 2004 Iowa State Cyclones football team represented Iowa State University in the 2004 NCAA Division I-A football season.  They played their home games at Jack Trice Stadium in Ames, Iowa. They participated as members of the Big 12 Conference in the North Division.  They were coached by head coach Dan McCarney and defeated Miami (OH) in the Independence Bowl 17–13.

Schedule

References

Iowa State
Iowa State Cyclones football seasons
Independence Bowl champion seasons
Iowa State Cyclones football